Harry E. Ahles (1924–1981) was an American botanist.

Biography
Harry Ahles was born in 1924. Although he had no formal education beyond high school, his profound botanical knowledge allowed him to enter the botanical profession as an herbarium curator at the University of Illinois.

He later followed Ritchie Bell to North Carolina to study the flora of that state, becoming the herbarium curator of the University of North Carolina, Chapel Hill in 1956. Albert E. Radford, Ahles, and Bell published the Manual of the Vascular Flora of the Carolinas in 1968 as a result of these researches. Ahles left Chapel Hill in 1966 due, in part, to his dislike of the installation of air conditioning in the herbarium. He took a position at the University of Massachusetts at Amherst.

Ahles collected over 200,000 specimens while at Chapel Hill, and was similarly active at Amherst, where he built a log cabin atop Horse Mountain for his residence. He died in 1981.

References

1924 births
1981 deaths
20th-century American botanists
University of Illinois Urbana-Champaign faculty
University of North Carolina at Chapel Hill faculty
University of Massachusetts Amherst faculty